Peter Fook Meng Choong  is an Australian doctor and professor who specializes in orthopaedics. He is the Director of Orthopaedics at St. Vincent's Hospital, Melbourne and the Hugh Devine Chair of Surgery at the University of Melbourne. In 2014, he became the first surgeon to perform a 3D-printed heel transplant.

Early life and education

Choong was born in Kuala Lumpur, Malaysia. He was a non-resident student of  Trinity College from 1979 onwards while completing his undergraduate studies at the University of Melbourne, which he did in 1984, before continuing with his advanced surgical training at St. Vincent's Hospital, Melbourne. After earning his MD, he was appointed to orthopaedic fellowships at University Hospital in Lund, Sweden and the Mayo Clinic in the U.S. state of Minnesota.

Career

Choong was named the Director of Orthopaedics at St. Vincent's Hospital, Melbourne in 1996. He also established the Sarcoma Service at the Peter MacCallum Cancer Centre at that time. Between 2005 and 2008, he served as Chief Medical Officer at St. Vincent's. In 2009, he was named the Hugh Devine Chair of Surgery at the University of Melbourne. In 2013, Choong was appointed President of the Australian Orthopaedic Association. Together with Gordon Wallace of the ARC Centre of Excellence for Electromaterials Science, Choong also began working with the BioPen, a handheld 3D printer used by surgeons to deliver cells and other materials to repair damaged tissue. He helped develop concepts for use in clinical trials. Choong and Wallace's work with the BioPen appeared in a 2016 issue of the journal, Biofabrication.

In October 2014, Choong performed the first 3D-printed heel transplant using a titanium heel replica. As of 2018, Choong is the head of the musculoskeletal research program at St. Vincent's Hospital, the Chair of the Bone and Soft Tissue Sarcoma Service at the Peter MacCallum Cancer Centre, and has contributed to over 360 peer-reviewed articles. He is also a leader in the National Health and Medical Research Council's Centre for Research Excellence.

In June 2022, Choong was appointed Officer of the Order of Australia in the 2022 Queen's Birthday Honours for "distinguished service to orthopaedic medicine, to research and tertiary medical education, and to professional associations".

References

External links
Choong at the Peter MacCallum Cancer Centre
Choong at the University of Melbourne

Living people
Malaysian emigrants to Australia
Officers of the Order of Australia
People from Kuala Lumpur
People educated at Trinity College (University of Melbourne)
University of Melbourne alumni
Year of birth missing (living people)